Vatica borneensis is a tree in the family Dipterocarpaceae, native to Borneo.

Description
The inflorescences are dense and bear pinkish brown flowers.

Distribution and habitat
Vatica borneensis is endemic to Borneo.

Conservation
Vatica borneensis has been assessed as near threatened on the IUCN Red List. It is threatened by logging for its timber, which is used for flooring and furniture. However, the species is found in protected areas.

References

borneensis
Endemic flora of Borneo
Plants described in 1887
Taxa named by William Burck